Karel Štefl (born 16 March 1946) is a Czech cross-country skier. He competed in the men's 15 kilometre event at the 1968 Winter Olympics.

References

External links
 

1946 births
Living people
Czech male cross-country skiers
Olympic cross-country skiers of Czechoslovakia
Cross-country skiers at the 1968 Winter Olympics
People from Nové Město na Moravě
Sportspeople from the Vysočina Region